The 1876 Burnley by-election was held on 12 February 1876.  The byelection was fought due to the death of the incumbent Liberal MP, Richard Shaw.  It was won by the Liberal candidate Peter Rylands.

References

1876 elections in the United Kingdom
1876 in England
1870s in Lancashire
Politics of Burnley
By-elections to the Parliament of the United Kingdom in Lancashire constituencies